South Knighton may refer to:
 South Knighton, Devon, England
 South Knighton, Leicestershire, England